Siphonochelus nipponensis is a species of sea snail, a marine gastropod mollusk in the family Muricidae, the murex snails or rock snails.

Description

Distribution
This marine species occurs off Papua New Guinea.

References

Siphonochelus japonicus (A. Adams, 1863) and Siphonochelus nipponensis Keen & Campbell, 1964, and Their Intricate History with the Description of a New Siphonochelus Species from Mozambique (Gastropoda: Muricidae). Venus 75(1-4): 27-38

External links
 Keen A.M. & Campbell G.B. (1964). Ten new species of Typhinae (Gastropoda: Muricidae). The Veliger. 7(1): 46-57, 4 pls

nipponensis
Gastropods described in 1964